Platanthera integrilabia, commonly called white fringeless orchid, is a species of flowering plant in the orchid family (Orchidaceae). It is native to the Southeastern United States. Its natural habitat is in boggy acidic seeps and flats, usually in partial open sunlight.

Description
Platanthera integrilabia is a mycotrophic perennial. Leaves are restricted to the base of the stem. It produces a white spike of flowers at the end of a long bracted scape. It typically flowers from late July to early September, but can flower as early as June in the southern part of its range. The percentage of flowering individuals in a population for a given year is typically low, with many individuals reproducing clonally through tubers.

Conservation
Platanthera integrilabia is a rare species throughout its range. There are roughly 60 known extant populations, most of which consist of less than 100 individuals (although some populations have up to 1,000). Populations have declined greatly due to fire suppression, which has created an unfavorably dense canopy throughout much of its range. In addition, wetland destruction in the form of draining for agriculture and the creation of farm ponds has eliminated much of its former bog and seep habitat. In 2016, Platanthera integrilabia was listed as Threatened by the Endangered Species Act, after being a candidate for listing since 1980.

References

integrilabia